Eastfield may refer to:

United Kingdom

England 
Eastfield, Bristol, a location
Eastfield, Northumberland, a location
Eastfield, North Yorkshire
Eastfield, Peterborough in Cambridgeshire
Eastfield, South Yorkshire, a location
Eastfields, an area in the London Borough of Merton
Mitcham Eastfields railway station, serving the above locality

Scotland 
Eastfield, Cumbernauld, a suburb of Cumbernauld, North Lanarkshire, name used in addition to/as alternative to Balloch
Eastfield, Edinburgh
Eastfield, Harthill, a village associated with Harthill, North Lanarkshire
Eastfield, Scottish Borders, a location
Eastfield, South Lanarkshire (part of the Rutherglen/Cambuslang urban area)
Eastfields, a 2010s development in Carntyne, Glasgow

United States
Eastfield Mall in Springfield, Massachusetts, used interchangeably with the surrounding retail district
Eastfield College, a community college in Mesquite, Texas